The 2023 Grand Prix de Denain – Porte du Hainaut was the 64th edition of the Grand Prix de Denain one-day road cycling race. It was held on 16 March 2023 as a category 1.Pro race on the 2023 UCI ProSeries calendar.

Teams 
Nine of the 18 UCI WorldTeams, seven UCI ProTeams, and three UCI Continental teams made up the 19 teams that participated in the race. Two teams did not enter a full squad of seven riders;  entered six riders, while  entered five riders. In total, 129 riders started the race, of which 87 finished.

UCI WorldTeams

 
 
 
 
 
 
 
 
 

UCI ProTeams

 
 
 
 
 
 
 

UCI Continental Teams

Result

References

External links 
  

2023
2023 in French sport
2023 UCI ProSeries
March 2023 sports events in France